Northstar is self-titled album released in 2004 by Northstar, which was produced by RZA under the alias Bobby Digital.

Track listing

 "Luv Allah" (featuring Beretta 9) (Grier, Johnson, Murray. S) – 4:10
 "We Got It" (featuring Free Murda) (Drayton, Grier, Johnson) – 2:50
 "Skit" (Grier, Johnson, Klien ) – 1:15
 "Red Rum" (featuring ShaCronz, Mikey Jarrett, Jr., and ShoShot) (Drayton, Grier, Johnson) – 4:08
 "Skit" (Grier, Johnson, Klien) – 0:23
 "Crazy" (featuring West Coast Killa Beez) (Grier, Harris, Johnson, Saxton) – 4:26
 "Nuttin'" (featuring Killarmy) (Grier, Johnson) – 3:49
 "Skit" (Grier, Johnson, Klien ) – 1:00
 "See Me" (featuring Free Murda) (Drayton, Grier, Johnson) – 3:29
 "64" (Grier, Johnson) – 3:00
 "So So Serious" (featuring T.M.F.) (Grier, Johnson) – 2:34
 "Duckie" (Grier, Johnson) – 2:51
 "Ballin'" (featuring Solomon Childs, and Suga Bang Bang) (	Dale, Grier, Johnson, Saadiq) – 3:59
 "Destiny" (featuring Beretta 9) (Grier, Johnson, Murray) – 4:06
 "Black Knights of the Northstar" (featuring Black Knights) (Cunningham, Grier, Johnson) – 2:47

Personnel 

 Solomon Childs – Vocals, Guest Appearance
 Christ Bearer – Vocals, Group Member
 Calvin Cooler – Skit, Guest Appearance
 Cliff Cultreri – A&R
 Dr. Dooom – Vocals, Guest Appearance
 Freemurder – Vocals, Guest Appearance
 Jeff Gilligan – Art Direction, Design
 Joe Giron – Photography
 Kinetic – Vocals, Guest Appearance
 Mathematics – Producer
 Meko – Vocals, Group Member
 Midnight – Vocals, Guest Appearance
 Mix Jive Musick – Producer
 Ninth Prince – Vocals, Guest Appearance
 D.R. Period – Producer
 RZA – Producer, Executive Producer
 Shacronz – Vocals, Guest Appearance
 Shoshot – Vocals, Guest Appearance
 Suga Bang Bang – Vocals, Guest Appearance
 TMF – Vocals, Guest Appearance
 Tonebone – Vocals, Guest Appearance
 Armand Van Helden – Producer

References

2004 albums
Albums produced by RZA
Northstar (rap group) albums